Harry Touw (7 April 1924 – 14 April 1994) was a Dutch comedian and television actor from The Hague, who rose to national prominence playing the characters Otto Kolkvet and Fred Haché in the satirical comedy shows written and directed by Wim T. Schippers, Ruud van Hemert, Gied Jaspars, and Wim van der Linden. He also sang, and made a number of records (including Bakken aan de Bar).

External links
Harry Touw on Discogs

1924 births
1994 deaths
Dutch male comedians
Dutch male television actors
Entertainers from The Hague
Wim T. Schippers
20th-century dramatists and playwrights
20th-century Dutch male actors
20th-century Dutch male writers
20th-century comedians
20th-century screenwriters